"Uncle Walter" is a song from Ben Folds Five's 1995 self-titled debut album. It was written by lead singer Ben Folds.

History
Ben Folds has stated:

Charles Leahy, first cousin of songwriter (and Folds' former wife) Anna Goodman, corroborates this in a June 2006 interview:

Additional versions
This song appears on the Ben Folds Five Live album which was released on June 4, 2013. It was recorded at the Kool Haus, Toronto, Ontario, Canada, 10/5/12.

Singles

U.S. promotional CD single
Released in 1996 to radio programmers in the United States to promote the song and the album Ben Folds Five. Features the album cut of the song.
Uncle Walter  – 3:49

European commercial CD single
Released in 1996 in Europe by Intercord Records for Passenger/Caroline. Features the album cut of the song. The other tracks were recorded live on August 12, 1995, at Ziggy's in Winston-Salem, North Carolina, by John Alagia and Doug Derryberry. The tracks were mixed at Rutabaga Studios in May 1996. "Tom & Mary" also appears on the Japanese release of Ben Folds Five.
Uncle Walter  – 3:49
Tom & Mary (Live)  – 2:51
Emaline (Live)  – 3:40

Australian commercial CD single
Released on 21 October 1996 in Australia by Virgin Records for Passenger/Caroline. Features the album cut of the song. The other tracks were recorded live on August 12, 1995, at Ziggy's in Winston-Salem, North Carolina, by John Alagia and Doug Derryberry. The tracks were mixed at Rutabaga Studios in May 1996. "Tom & Mary" also appears on the Japanese release of Ben Folds Five.
Uncle Walter  – 3:49
Tom & Mary (Live)  – 2:51
Emaline (Live)  – 3:40

Compilations and soundtracks
The song appears on the 1996 Caroline Records compilation album How Low Can A Punk Get.

Personnel
Ben Folds – piano, vocals
Darren Jessee – drums, vocals
Robert Sledge – bass, vocals

Production
Producer: Caleb Southern
Mixing: Marc Becker

References

Ben Folds Five songs
1996 singles
Songs written by Ben Folds
1995 songs
Caroline Records singles